Hugo Romeo Guerra Cabrera (25 February 1966 – 11 May 2018) was a Uruguayan footballer.

Club career
Guerra played for Gimnasia y Esgrima La Plata, Huracán, Boca Juniors and Ferro Carril Oeste in the Primera División de Argentina. He also had a spell with Toluca in the Primera División de Mexico.

International career
Guerra made eight appearances for the senior Uruguay national football team from 1992 to 1993. He played for Uruguay at the Copa América 1993. Guerra made his debut in a friendly match against Brazil (1-0 win) on April 30, 1992 in the Estadio Centenario in Montevideo under coach Luis Alberto Cubilla.

He died on 11 May 2018 at the age of 52 from cardiac arrest.

References

External links

1966 births
2018 deaths
1993 Copa América players
Argentine Primera División players
Association football forwards
Atlético Tucumán footballers
Boca Juniors footballers
Club Nacional de Football players
Deportivo Toluca F.C. players
El Tanque Sisley players
Expatriate footballers in Argentina
Expatriate footballers in Mexico
Ferro Carril Oeste footballers
Club de Gimnasia y Esgrima La Plata footballers
Club Atlético Huracán footballers
Peñarol players
Tiro Federal footballers
Uruguayan footballers
Uruguayan expatriate footballers
Uruguay international footballers
People from Canelones, Uruguay